Rugged Point Marine Provincial Park is a provincial park in British Columbia, Canada, located at the southeast entrance to Kyuquot Sound on the west coast of Vancouver Island. It is remote and largely visited by kayakers.

References

Provincial parks of British Columbia
Kyuquot Sound region
1989 establishments in British Columbia
Protected areas established in 1989
Marine parks of Canada